Jordi Solé i Ferrando (born 26 October 1976) is a Catalan politician from Spain. Since January 2017, he has served as a Member of the European Parliament for the Republican Left of Catalonia.

Parliamentary service
Member, Committee on Foreign Affairs (2017–)
Member, Committee on Budgets (2017–)

References

External links
Jordi Solé

1976 births
Living people
Republican Left of Catalonia MEPs
MEPs for Spain 2014–2019
MEPs for Spain 2019–2024